Salin-de-Giraud is a village located in the commune of Arles in Bouches-du-Rhône (canton Arles-Ouest), approximately 40 kilometers from the city center of Arles.

History
Salin-de-Giraud lies southeast of the Camargue delta, on the right bank of the Rhône. The village was established in 1856.

See also
Camargue

References

External links

1856 establishments in France
Arles
Camargue
Seaside resorts in France
Villages in Provence-Alpes-Côte d'Azur